The 1918 Georgetown Blue and Gray football team represented Georgetown University during the 1918 college football season. Led by Albert Exendine in his fifth year as head coach, the team went 3–2.

Schedule

References

Georgetown
Georgetown Hoyas football seasons
Georgetown Blue and Gray football